The United States–Hong Kong Agreement for the Surrender of Fugitive Offenders is an extradition treaty signed by the United States and Hong Kong in 1996.

Extraditions
Extraditions under the treaty include cases from:
Two convicted perpetrators of the Boston Chinatown massacre

References

Treaties of the United States
Treaties of Hong Kong
Treaties concluded in 1996
Extradition treaties
Treaties entered into force in 1997
Hong Kong–United States relations
Hong Kong